The 20th Santosham Film Awards or also, 20th Santosham South Indian Film Awards (officially Santosham – Suman TV South Indian Film Awards 2021) was an awards ceremony held at Hyderabad, India on 14 November 2021. The ceremony (20th Santosham Film Awards) recognized the best films and performances from the Tollywood films and music released in 2019 and 2020, along with special honors for lifetime contributions and a few special awards. The awards are annually presented by Santosham magazine. The event replaced the 18th and 19th ceremonies of Santosham Film Awards. The 18th awards ceremony was scheduled to be held in September 2020, which was cancelled to due to COVID-19 pandemic in India.

Honorary Awards 

 Lifetime Achievement Award – Bharathiraja, Murali Mohan
Santosham Allu Ramalingaiah Smaraka Award (2019) – Murali Mohan
Santosham Allu Ramalingaiah Smaraka Award (2020) – L. B. Sriram
 Santosham Akkineni Smaraka Award (2019) – Suman
Santosham Akkineni Smaraka Award (2020) – Giri Babu
Santosham Daggubati Ramanaidu Smaraka Award – Adiseshagiri Rao
Santosham EVV Smaraka Award – Vijay Kanakamedala for Naandhi
Santosham Dasari Smaraka Award – Bommarillu Bhaskar
Santosham Ramu Smaraka Award – Malashri

2019 Main Awards

Film

2020 Main Awards

Film

Music

Special awards 

 Most Promising Actress – Payal Rajput
 Special Jury Award – Aditi Bhavaraju for "Baavochhadu" from  Palasa 1978

Presenters

Performers 

 Monal Gajjar
 Divi Vaidya
 Akhil Sarthak
 Hamida
 Pragathi
 Indraja
 Mishra
 Hebah Patel
Raai Laxmi
 Sandeep & Jyothi Raj

Note

References 

2021 Indian film awards
Santosham Film Awards
2021 film awards